Agia is a rock in the Meteora rock formation complex of Thessaly, Greece. The rock overlooks the town of Kalabaka.

The main rock known as Megali Agia, or "Large Aya." The lower part is called Mikri Agia (Μικρή Αγιά), or "Small Aya."

Monastery of the Holy Apostles
The ruins of the Monastery of the Holy Apostles ( or ) are located on the rock. It was founded in the early 16th century, perhaps by the monk Kallistos and has been documented in 1551. Only ruins, murals, carved stairs, and a cistern remain.

References

Rocks of Meteora